The Javan scimitar babbler (Pomatorhinus montanus) is a species of bird in the family Timaliidae. It is endemic to Java, Indonesia. The Sunda scimitar babbler (P. bornensis), which is found in Sumatra, Borneo, and Malaysia, was formerly considered conspecific, with both species being grouped as the chestnut-backed scimitar babbler. Its natural habitats are subtropical or tropical moist lowland forest and subtropical or tropical moist montane forest.

References

Collar, N. J. & Robson, C. 2007. Family Timaliidae (Babblers)  pp. 70 – 291 in; del Hoyo, J., Elliott, A. & Christie, D.A. eds. Handbook of the Birds of the World, Vol. 12. Picathartes to Tits and Chickadees. Lynx Edicions, Barcelona.

Javan scimitar babbler
Javan scimitar babbler
Taxonomy articles created by Polbot
Endemic fauna of Java
Birds of Java